The East Riding (Fortress) Royal Engineers was a volunteer unit of Britain's Royal Engineers formed for the defence of the Humber Estuary in the East Riding of Yorkshire. As well as serving in this role it also provided field and specialist engineer units in both World Wars. Its successors continued to serve in the Territorial Army until 1991.

Precursor unit
As early as 1870 a government defence committee recommended that coastal artillery batteries defending British seaports should be supplemented by fixed minefields fired electrically from the shore, but it was not until the 1880s that this was acted upon. Lieutenant-General Sir Andrew Clarke, the Inspector-General of Fortifications 1882–6, found that he did not have enough Regular Royal Engineers (RE) to man these additional defences, so he utilised the Volunteer Engineers for this task. After successful trials the system was rolled out to ports around the country. In 1886 a meeting held at the instigation of Sir Albert Rollit agreed to form a corps of Volunteer Submarine Miners in Hull to man the defences of the Humber Estuary. The new company was entitled the Humber Division Submarine Miners and comprised  60 men, many of them highly skilled craftsmen attracted by the considerably higher pay during training periods than was offered to other Volunteer units. The first officers' commissions were issued on 11 September 1886 and the corps ranked 4th in the list of submarine miners.

The company was accommodated in Hull adjacent to the 2nd East Riding Artillery Volunteers'  Wenlock Barracks, and High Paull House, close to Fort Paull in the coastal village of Paull, was altered to house the unit's equipment. The unit soon expanded to a strength of three companies, but in 1891 the War Office decided that some of the submarine mining defences would be better served by the Militia. The Humber Submarine Miners were disbanded the following year and reconstituted as a militia unit, but many of the Volunteers resigned rather than transfer to more onerous terms of service.

Territorial Force
When the Volunteers were subsumed into the new Territorial Force (TF) under the Haldane Reforms in 1908, the remaining submarine miners were converted into fortress engineers, but in the case of the Humber defences a completely new unit had to be raised. It was entitled the East Riding (Fortress) Royal Engineers, with its HQ at Colonial Street, Hull, and consisted of No 1 Works Company and No 2 Electric Lights Company, which operated searchlights for the coastal guns.

First World War

Mobilisation
On the outbreak of the First World War, the TF was mobilised and the fortress engineers took up their war stations in the North Eastern Coast Defences. TF units were invited to volunteer for Overseas Service and on 15 August 1914 the War Office issued instructions to separate those men who had signed up for Home Service only, and form these into reserve units. On 31 August, the formation of a reserve or 2nd Line unit was authorised for each 1st Line unit (prefixed '1/') where 60 per cent or more of the men had volunteered for Overseas Service.

Although the East Coast was attacked by the German High Seas Fleet on 16 December 1914 (the Raid on Scarborough, Hartlepool and Whitby) and again on 24 April 1916 (the Bombardment of Yarmouth and Lowestoft), and was regularly bombed by Zeppelin airships, the fortress engineers were nevertheless able to release 1st Line men to provide 1/1st East Riding Field Company, RE for active service in the field. A 581st (Humber) Fortress Company was also formed, about which little is known.

1/1st East Riding Field Company
The company embarked for France on 17 September 1915, and three days later it joined the Regular 3rd Division serving with the British Expeditionary Force (BEF) on the Western Front. They were just in time to participate in the Second British attack at Bellewaarde in the Ypres Salient, a subsidiary action to the Battle of Loos.

Subsequently, the company was part of 3rd Division in the following engagements:

1916
 Ypres Salient
 Actions of St. Eloi Craters
 Gas attacks at Wulverghem
 Battle of the Somme
 Battle of Bazentin Ridge
 Battle of Delville Wood
 Battle of the Ancre

1917
When the TF engineers were numbered in February 1917, the company became 529th (East Riding) Field Company, RE.

 Battle of Arras
 First Battle of the Scarpe
 Second Battle of the Scarpe
 Battle of Arleux
 Third Battle of the Scarpe
 Capture of Rœux
 Third Ypres Offensive
 Battle of the Menin Road Ridge
 Battle of Polygon Wood

1918
 German spring offensive
 Battle of St Quentin
 First Battle of Bapaume
 Battle of Arras
 Battle of Estaires
 Battle of Hazebrouck
 Battle of Bethune
 Allied Hundred Days Offensive
 Battle of Albert
 Second Battle of Bapaume
 Battle of the Canal du Nord
 Battle of Cambrai
 Battle of the Selle

After the Armistice, 3rd Division entered Germany as part of the Occupation of the Rhineland. TF troops were progressively demobilised, with 529th (ER) Fd Co disbanding about September 1919.

Anti-aircraft defence
As well as operating searchlights for the coastal defence guns, the RE fortress companies began to operate them in the anti-aircraft (AA) role as the war progressed and raids by airships and fixed wing bombers became more frequent. The North East coastal towns of England were particularly hard hit by Zeppelins during 1915 and 1916, and by mid-1916, the East Riding and North Riding Fortress Engineers had combined to provide the personnel for No 3 (Yorkshire) AA Company, RE. Later a barrage line of lights was organised up the East Coast with the East Riding Fortress Engineers providing  No 39 AA Company at Killingholme, while Hull was protected by No 38 AA Company and East Riding personnel guarding Sheffield were relieved by No 40 AA Company, both manned by the Tyne Electrical Engineers. By May 1918 this formed part of Northern Air Defences (NAD). At this stage of the war the NAD was barely troubled by German raids, and most of the men of medical category A1 had been withdrawn from the AA defences and sent to join the British Expeditionary Force on the Western Front All TF units were demobilised in 1919 after the Armistice with Germany.

Interwar
The East Riding (Fortress) Engineers, consisting of No 1 (Works) and Nos 2 and 3 (Lights) Companies, was reformed in the renamed Territorial Army (TA) in 1920, forming part of North Eastern Coastal Defences in 50th (Northumbrian) Divisional Area, with its HQ still at Colonial St, Hull. However, by 1939 it had been reduced to a single Electric Light and Works company.

Second World War

Mobilisation
The East Riding Fortress Engineers were mobilised in the Humber Coast defences on 3 September 1939. Some time after December 1941 the unit was converted into 542nd Electrical and Mechanical Company, RE. Whereas the Royal Electrical and Mechanical Engineers (formed in 1942) maintained vehicles and complex weapons and equipment, the RE's E&M companies worked with heavy electrical engineering plant, such as generators and pumps. In December 1942 the company landed in North Africa with First Army (Operation Torch), transferring to Allied Forces Headquarters in February 1943. Later in the year it moved to Italy.

Italy
During the Italian Campaign the re-establishment of electric power supplies was critical. Power stations in the south of the country were quickly captured intact, but north of Naples and Foggia the Germans had destroyed everything to do with electricity supply: power stations, sub-stations, hydro-electric dam sluices, transmission lines and pylons were all wrecked. Repair was a collaborative effort of the British Royal Engineers and Royal Navy with US and Italian engineers, under an Electric Power Committee set up in December 1943. Once the Allies reached Rome in mid-1944 they discovered that less than 10 per cent of the 800,000 kW generating capacity of central Italy was in working order. Over the succeeding months 542nd E&M Company was engaged in re-establishing transmission lines, alongside 540th (formerly the Renfrewshire Fortress Engineers), 541st (formerly the North Riding Fortress Engineers), 543rd and 544th (Palestinian) E&M Companies.

The company was disbanded after September 1945.

Postwar
When the TA was reconstituted in 1947, the East Riding Fortress Engineers were reformed as 542 (East Riding) Construction Squadron in 118 Construction Regiment (itself descended from the North Riding Fortress Engineers).

When the TA was reorganised in 1961, 542 Sqn was transferred as a field squadron to 129 Corps Engineer Regiment. Then when the TA was converted into the TAVR in 1967, 129 Regt was reduced to a single 129 (East Riding) Field Squadron based at Hull, and included in a new 72 (Tyne Electrical Engineers) Engineer Regiment.
 In 1977 the squadron was transferred again, this time to 73 Engineer Regiment. Finally, it was broken up in April 1991, with part going to the Humber Artillery Company of 2nd Battalion Yorkshire Volunteers, and part to 131 Commando Squadron Royal Engineers.

129 Field Sqn was reformed in April 2006, but disbanded again in 2014 under the 'Army 2020' proposals, when 73 Engineer Rgt was reduced to a single squadron.

Prominent members
 The Scottish archaeologist Charles S. T. Calder served with 529th (East Riding) Field Company towards the end of the First World War.

Notes

References
 Maj A.F. Becke,History of the Great War: Order of Battle of Divisions, Part 1: The Regular British Divisions, London: HM Stationery Office, 1934/Uckfield: Naval & Military Press, 2007, .
 Maj A.F. Becke,History of the Great War: Order of Battle of Divisions, Part 2b: The 2nd-Line Territorial Force Divisions (57th–69th), with the Home-Service Divisions (71st–73rd) and 74th and 75th Divisions, London: HM Stationery Office, 1937/Uckfield: Naval & Military Press, 2007, .
 Ian F.W. Beckett, Riflemen Form: A study of the Rifle Volunteer Movement 1859–1908, Aldershot: Ogilby Trusts, 1982, .
 Capt Joseph Morris, The German Air Raids on Great Britain 1914–1918, first published 1925/Stroud: Nonsuch, 2007, .
 R.W.S. Norfolk, Militia, Yeomanry and Volunteer Forces of the East Riding 1689–1908, York: East Yorkshire Local History Society, 1965.
 Maj-Gen R.P. Pakenham-Walsh, History of the Royal Engineers, Vol IX, 1938–1948, Chatham: Institution of Royal Engineers, 1958.
 Maj O.M. Short, Maj H. Sherlock, Capt L.E.C.M. Perowne and Lt M.A. Fraser, The History of the Tyne Electrical Engineers, Royal Engineers, 1884–1933, 1933/Uckfield: Naval & Military, nd, .
 Titles and Designations of Formations and Units of the Territorial Army, London: War Office, 7 November 1927.
 Graham E. Watson & Richard A. Rinaldi, The Corps of Royal Engineers: Organization and Units 1889–2018, Tiger Lily Books, 2018, .
 R.A. Westlake, Royal Engineers (Volunteers) 1859–1908, Wembley: R.A. Westlake, 1983, .

External sources
 British Army units from 1945 on
 Mark Conrad, The British Army in 1914.
 Fort Paull website
 Great War Forum 
 The Long, Long Trail
 RE Museum
 Sappers site

Fortress units of the Royal Engineers
Military units and formations in the East Riding of Yorkshire
Military units and formations in Kingston upon Hull
Military units and formations established in 1908